The 1000 Guineas is a Group One set-weights Thoroughbred horse race for three-year-old fillies run over a distance of 1600 metres (1 mile) at Riccarton Park in Christchurch, New Zealand.

Christchurch New Zealand Cup week

It is on the final Saturday of Christchurch's famous Christchurch "Cup Week" held in the second week of November.

For thoroughbred horses the week also features:

 the New Zealand 2000 Guineas on the first Saturday 
 the Coupland's Bakeries Mile on the Wednesday
 the Stewards Handicap sprint on the final Saturday
 the New Zealand Cup on the final Saturday

Christchurch Cup week includes premier standardbred meetings at Addington raceway including:

 the New Zealand Trotting Cup for pacers on the Tuesday
 the New Zealand Free For All for pacers on the Friday
 the Dominion Handicap for trotters on the Friday

There is also greyhound racing on the Thursday, including the following Group 1 races:

 the New Zealand Galaxy - C5f 295m
 the New Zealand Greyhound Cup - C5f 520m
 the New Zealand Stayers Cup - C2df 732m

The week also features the Canterbury A&P Show

History

Until 1973, both the New Zealand Oaks and the New Zealand Derby were run at Riccarton. When those races were moved to Trentham and Ellerslie respectively, Riccarton was awarded two new classic races, the 1000 and 2000 Guineas over 1600 metres (1 mile). These races are based on those of the same name in the United Kingdom, run at Newmarket in the first weekend in May.

Both races have quickly established themselves on the New Zealand calendar, and the 1000 Guineas routinely attracts all of the country's leading fillies and, as a crucial race in the Filly Of The Year series, is regularly taken out by the eventual winner of that title.

Among the best recent winners are Katie Lee, Seachange, King's Rose, the brilliant but ill-fated Taatletail and Tycoon Lil.

The 1000 Guineas has been run for a total stake of:

 1975 - $20,000
 1986 - $100,000
 1994 - $100,000
 2003 - $275,000
 2007 - $325,000
 2019 - $300,000.

Recent results

See also
 Recent winners of major races for 3-year-old horses
 Desert Gold Stakes
 Hawke's Bay Guineas
 New Zealand Oaks
 Levin Classic
 New Zealand Derby
 Karaka Million

References

Horse races in New Zealand
Flat horse races for three-year-olds

ja:ニュージーランドダービー